

Notable missions

Solar Orbiter

Mars 2020

Landsat 9

Lucy

Launch statistics

Launch sites

Launch outcomes

Rocket configurations

Launch history

2020

2021

2022

Future launches 
In August 2021, ULA announced that Atlas V would be retired, and all 29 remaining launches had been sold. , 19 launches remain, all of which are listed here: 7 Starliner missions, 9 launches for Kuiper, and 3 other launches.

2023

2024

See also 

 List of Thor and Delta launches (2020–2029)

References 

Atlas